Nonstructural protein 4A (NS4A) is a viral protein found in the hepatitis C virus. It acts as a cofactor for the enzyme NS3.

References

Viral nonstructural proteins
Hepatitis C virus